Kramarov may refer to:
Grigory Kramarov, Bolshevik advocate of space flight
Savely Kramarov (1934–1995), Soviet/Russian actor
Kramarov (crater)